WPU may refer to:
 William Paterson University, New Jersey, United States
 Western Philippines University, a public university in Palawan province